is a Japanese Nippon Professional Baseball (NPB) pitcher who last played for the Yomiuri Giants in Japan's Central League.

In October, 2015, Fukuda was named as a result of an investigation conducted by the Giants into illegal betting on professional and high school baseball games by its players. On 9 November 2015, the Giants organization terminated Fukuda's contract, along with fellow pitchers Shoki Kasahara and Ryuya Matsumoto. On 10 November the NPB league commissioner penalized the three players with indefinite disqualification. Under league rules, Fukuda will be able to apply for readmission to the league after 5 years if he satisfies the commissioner that he is remorseful for his actions. The disqualification extends to American Major League Baseball and the professional leagues in China, Korea and Taiwan. The players avoided permanent disqualification because the investigation found no evidence that they were involved in fixing matches.

The Giants were also fined ¥10 million over the incident and the team's representative at the NPB, Atsushi Harasawa, resigned to take responsibility.

References

External links

1983 births
Japanese expatriate baseball players in the Dominican Republic
Living people
Nippon Professional Baseball pitchers
Baseball people from Osaka Prefecture
People from Kishiwada, Osaka
Yomiuri Giants players
Gigantes del Cibao players